Ambassadors of Russia are the individuals appointed by the President of Russia to serve as the head of Russian diplomatic mission to the respective countries, international organisations, or as ambassador-at-large. Ambassadors serve at the pleasure of the president. Ambassadors change regularly for the reasons like resignment or retirement. The modern position of ambassador was established during the Soviet era by the Supreme Soviet of the Soviet Union. 

This article represents the current list of Russian ambassadors. The list is updated preodically on Ambassadors and Representatives of Russia, Ministry of Foreign Affairs.

Current Russian ambassadors 
This list is arranged by continents.

Africa

Asia

Australia

Europe

See also 

 Lists of ambassadors of Russia
 List of diplomatic missions of Russia
 Foreign relations of Russia

References

External links 

 Ambassadors of Russia to the African countries
 Diplomatic missions of the Soviet Union
 Ambassadors of the Soviet Union to the African countries
Ambassadors of Russian Federation to the Asian countries
Embassies of the Soviet Union
Ambassadors of the Soviet Union to the Asian countries
Ambassadors of Russia to the Pacific states
Ambassadors of the Soviet Union in the Pacific states
Ambassador of Russia to European countries
Ambassadors of the Soviet Union to the European countries

Ambassadors of Russia